Tertiary enrollment rates are an expression of the percentage of high school graduates that successfully enroll into university. More precisely, the tertiary enrollment rate is the percentage of total enrollment, regardless of age, in post-secondary institutions to the population of people within five years of the age at which students normally graduate high school.

Rankings
 1  	United States:	72.6%
 2      Finland:	        70.4%
 3  	Norway:	        70%
 3  	Sweden:	        70%
 5  	New Zealand:	69.2%
 6  	Russia:	        64.1%
 7  	Australia:	        63.3%
 8  	Latvia:	        63.1%
 9  	Slovenia:	        60.5%
 10  	Canada:	        60%

References

Higher education